Mark Patterson (born 26 May 1969) is an Indian field hockey player. He competed in the men's tournament at the 1988 Summer Olympics. Patterson was born in Mumbai to former Indian international goalkeeper Terence Patterson and is currently based in Perth, Australia.

References

External links
 

1969 births
Living people
Indian male field hockey players
Olympic field hockey players of India
Field hockey players at the 1988 Summer Olympics
Anglo-Indian people
Field hockey players from Mumbai
Field hockey players from Maharashtra
Asian Games medalists in field hockey
Asian Games silver medalists for India
Medalists at the 1990 Asian Games
Field hockey players at the 1990 Asian Games
Indian emigrants to Australia